Kamberhöyüğü is a village in Tarsus district of Mersin Province, Turkey. It is also a stop on railroad. The population of Kamberhöyüğü was 549  as of 2012. Kamberhöyüğü is known as the location of the clash during the War of Turkish Independence on 27 July 1920 in which French forces defeated local militia.

References

Villages in Tarsus District